Mihailo Vasić (born 20 July 1993) is a Serbian 3x3 basketball player for Liman 3x3 of the FIBA 3x3 World Tour. Also, he represents the Serbian national team internationally.

Early life 
Vasić grew up with a Novi Sad-based team Vojvodina. In 2013, he moved to the United States where he played high school basketball with Lee Academy as a senior. As a college freshman and sophomore, he played with the Harcum Bears of the National Junior College Athletic Association (NJCAA). In 2016, he joined the New Haven Chargers of the NCAA Division II where he played his junior and senior years.

3x3 career 
Vasić has been a member of Novi Sad-based Liman 3x3 team since 2017.

National 3x3 team career 
Vasić represents Serbian 3x3 national team internationally. He made his debut at the 2019 FIBA 3x3 World Cup where his team finished at 4th place. Also, he represented Serbia at the 2020 Summer Olympics.

References

External links 
 Mihailo Vasić at liman3x3.com
 Mihailo Vasić at Eurobasket
 
 Mihailo Vasić at realgm.com

1993 births
Living people
3x3 basketball players at the 2020 Summer Olympics
Basketball players from Belgrade
Forwards (basketball)
Harcum College alumni
KK Vojvodina players
Medalists at the 2020 Summer Olympics
Olympic 3x3 basketball players of Serbia
Olympic bronze medalists for Serbia
Olympic medalists in 3x3 basketball
Serbian expatriate basketball people in the United States
Serbian men's basketball players
Serbian men's 3x3 basketball players
New Haven Chargers men's basketball players